Cheshmeh Rana (also Romanized as Cheshmeh Ra‘nā; also known as Chashmeh-ye Ra‘nā Kord Shūl, Cheshmeh Ra‘nā Kord, Kord Shūl, and Kurd Shūl) is a village in Khonjesht Rural District, in the Central District of Eqlid County, Fars Province, Iran. At the 2006 census, its population was 2,186, in 436 families. The majority of the population of Cheshmeh Rana are from Kordshuli tribe.

References 

Populated places in Eqlid County
Kurdish settlements in Iran